Agent X44 is a 2007 Filipino action spy comedy film directed by Joyce E. Bernal and starring Vhong Navarro as Agent X44 with Mariel Rodriguez in her film debut. The film was also the last movie of veteran actor Tony Ferrer following his death in 2021. 
The film was produced by Star Cinema.

The film is based on the Agent X-44 character previously played by Tony Ferrer, which originated in the 1965 spy film G-2, directed by Eddie Garcia. In addition, Agent X44 and its director Joyce Bernal's third and last film where Navarro is the lead star after Mr. Suave (2003) and D' Anothers (2005).

Plot
The plot revolves around a secret agency with Reserve Agent King Aguila (Vhong Navarro) tasked to recover the Philippines' most important artifact. The artifact is the bolo of Lapu-lapu which he used to kill Magellan in 1521.

King Aguila and his best friend, Junior Iskalibers (Mura) take the entrance exam of the academy for secret agents. King is the godson of Agent X44 Tony Falcon (Tony Ferrer) who is approaching retirement. Ever since he was a child, King has idolized his ninong Tony and wanted to be a secret agent like him. King and Junior are admitted into the academy under the supervision of Colonel Cynthia Abordo (Pokwang), but they are the most incompetent trainees.

In the academy, King meets Mary Grace Talagtag (Mariel Rodriguez),another neophyte agent. She develops a crush on King, but keeps it to herself. One day, she asks king out on a date and decides to tell him her true feelings. She had barely said, "I love you" when King rushes out of the restaurant to save a girl. Thinking that King was embracing the girl, Mary Grace is convinced that he is a playboy. After graduating from the academy as Agent 690, she decides to accept the West Point training being offered to her, and leaves the country with bitter feelings towards King. When she returns from her training, Mary Grace immediately becomes the top agent in the country. Meanwhile, King and Junior graduate as "reserve agents" who temporarily work as janitors in the agency headquarters, much to their dismay.

One night, the Philippines' most important artifact, Lapulapu’s bolo which he used to kill Ferdinand Magellan in 1521, is stolen from the Philippine National Filipino Museum of the Philippines. Minerva Castillo (Cassandra Ponti), the museum’s curator, contacts the agency for help.

King is given three cases to solve, but he fails each and every one of them. The agency has no choice but to demote him to a clerical job. He longs to be given some fieldwork, but the agency will hear none of it until Magellan's dagger is reported stolen. Being the top agent, Mary Grace expects the high-profile mission to be assigned to her. Thus, she is shocked when Tony Falcon pushes that King is the best agent for the mission.

With the help of Junior, King nearly gets the dagger but he loses it again. Disappointed with King, Tony gets depressed and accidentally falls into a manhole. Cynthia (Pokwang), the agency head, decides to take King out of the mission. During Tony's wake, the ghost of Tony Falcon appears to her, telling her to put King back in the mission. Actually, Junior masterminded this trick. Cynthia decides to pair King with Mary Grace to retrieve the dagger for the final time.

The dagger falls into the hands of three rival crime lords - Mustafah Saleh (Uma Baron Khouny), an Arabian vampire millionaire who wants to retrieve the dagger because it is a threat to his family's oil business; Leah (Juliana Palermo), a Polynesian princess who wants to retrieve the dagger because they have the seawater resources but not the equipment to turn it into oil; and Purubutu-san (Epi Quizon), a Yakuza head who wants to retrieve the dagger because he has the seawater resources plus the machinery to market it all over the world.

Cast
Vhong Navarro as Reserve Agent King Agila / Agent X44
Mariel Rodriguez as Mary Grace Talagtag / Agent 690
Cassandra Ponti as Minerva Castillo
Uma Khouny as Mustafah Saleh
Pokwang as Cynthia Abordo
Mura as Anton / Agent Junior Iskalibers
Juliana Palermo as Selecta Papadakis
John Lapus as Baklus
Epi Quizon as Karansai Purubutu-san
Juddha Paolo as Mr. Clean

Special Participation
Tony Ferrer as Tony Falcon / Agent X44

Reception

Rating
MTRCB, a Philippine media board, has initially rated the movie R-18 due to topless scenes of both Cassandra Ponti and Mariel Rodriguez but was re-rated to PG-13.

Box office
On its opening day, Agent X44 did well as it grossed .

See also
ABS-CBN
Star Cinema

References

Agent X44 a big hit!
Congrats Vhong!

External links

2007 films
2007 action comedy films
2000s spy comedy films
Films directed by Joyce Bernal
Star Cinema films
2000s films
2007 comedy films
Philippine action comedy films
Filipino-language films